Rəhimoba (also, Ragimoba) is a village in the Khachmaz Rayon of Azerbaijan.  The village forms part of the municipality of Qaradağ Buduq.

References

External links

Populated places in Khachmaz District